The New Beginning in Osaka (2018) is a professional wrestling event promoted by New Japan Pro-Wrestling (NJPW). The event took place on February 10, 2018, in Osaka, Osaka, at the Osaka Prefectural Gymnasium and featured nine matches, three of which were contested for championships. In the main event, Kazuchika Okada defended the IWGP Heavyweight Championship against Sanada. This was the fourteenth event under the New Beginning name and the sixth to take place in Osaka.

Production

Background
The event will air worldwide on NJPW's internet streaming site, NJPW World, with English commentary provided by Kevin Kelly and Don Callis.

Storylines
The New Beginning in Osaka will feature nine professional wrestling matches, which will involve different wrestlers from pre-existing scripted feuds and storylines. The final five matches on the card feature Chaos and Los Ingobernables de Japón taking on one another in singles matches. Wrestlers portray villains, heroes, or less distinguishable characters in the scripted events that build tension and culminate in a wrestling match or series of matches.

Results

References

External links
The New Beginning at NJPW.co.jp

2018.2
2018 in professional wrestling
Events in Osaka
February 2018 events in Japan
Professional wrestling in Osaka